Nigel Smith (born 17 March 1951 in Surbiton, Surrey) is a British businessman and retired auto racing driver.

Racing career
His racing career started 1972 as a successful karting driver winning superkart grands prix in the Netherlands, Belgium and New Zealand. He made the switch to car racing in 1984, making appearances in Sports 2000 and Formula Ford. In 1990 and 1991 he was a front running driver in the Honda CRX Challenge. He privately entered a class B Ralt in the British Formula Three Championship in 1991 and 1992. In 1993 he competed in British Formula 2 with a Reynard 92D. He finished the season as the highest placed British driver with six podiums.

In 1994 his Team HMSO Cavalier, entered a former Ecurie Ecosse Vauxhall Cavalier in the British Touring Car Championship. A successful season saw him finish as runner-up in the Total Cup for Privateers. The team returned for another season in the BTCC in 1995, where Smith finished third in the privateers cup.

Smith went on to compete in touring car racing in North America and Sweden. In 1998 he competed in one season of the GTR Euroseries before spending two years in FIA GT Championship in a N-GT class Porsche 911 GT3.

Racing record

Complete British Touring Car Championship results
(key) (Races in bold indicate pole position) (Races in italics indicate fastest lap)

Complete Swedish Touring Car Championship results
(key) (Races in bold indicate pole position) (Races in italics indicate fastest lap)

Complete North American Touring Car Championship results
(Races in bold indicate pole position) (Races in italics indicate fastest lap)

24 Hours of Le Mans results

References

English racing drivers
British Touring Car Championship drivers
British Formula Three Championship drivers
FIA GT Championship drivers
1951 births
Living people
24 Hours of Spa drivers

North American Touring Car Championship drivers